Flavien may refer to
Flavien (given name)
Pont Flavien, a Roman bridge across the River Touloubre in southern France
Saint-Flavien, Quebec, a municipality in Canada